Gabriel Tudose (born 1 January 1996) is a Romanian footballer currently under contract with Unirea Slobozia.

References

1996 births
Living people
Romanian footballers
Association football midfielders
AFC Unirea Slobozia players